Hooker Chemical Company (or Hooker Electrochemical Company) was an American firm producing chloralkali products from 1903 to 1968. In 1922, bought the S. Wander & Sons Company to sell lye ​and chlorinated lime. The company became notorious in 1977, when residents near its chemical waste site, Love Canal, reported extraordinarily high incidences of leukemia, birth defects, and other injuries. Although Hooker had sold its old chemical waste dump site to the Niagara Falls School Board in 1953, the company was held responsible as a result of a lawsuit thereafter.

History

Founding
Founded in 1903 as "the Development and Funding Company" by Elon Huntington Hooker, of Rochester, NY, the company used the Townsend cell to electrolyse salt into chlorine and sodium hydroxide (NaOH), also known as "caustic soda" and "lye," in a chloralkali process. Elmer Sperry, founder of Sperry Electric, and Leo Baekeland, inventor of Bakelite and Velox photographic paper, consulted Hooker to improve the design of the cell.

The company was sited in Niagara Falls, NY foremost because of the low-cost electricity from the Niagara Falls power project, but also because of the abundance of salt from nearby mines, and availability of water from the Niagara River.

First product lines
Chlorine, used for sanitation and the chlorination of drinking water, was sold as chlorinated lime and chlorobenzene, which was an ingredient for an explosive used in World War I. Later, solvents like trichloroethylene ​and phenol were sold for use by the subsidiary degreasing and dry cleaning company Detrex. Hooker licensed his diaphragm cell technology to other chloralkali producers.

In 1918, Hooker formed a company to hydrogenate vegetable oils, while Hooker Chemical also began producing sulfur chloride and sodium chlorate.

In 1922, Hooker bought the S. Wander & Sons Company for the retail sales of lye and chlorinated lime. Samuel Wander had a retail store at 105 Hudson St, New York, NY, and factories in Albany, NY. Hooker sold the business in 1927. Hooker built a new chloralkali plant in Tacoma, WA in 1929. Additional products, including sodium sulfide, sodium sulfhydrate, sodium tetrasulfide, and aluminum chloride were produced by the company.

World War II
In World War II, Hooker was a leading supplier of dodecyl mercaptan for the synthesis of rubber. The company also produced arsenic trichloride, thionyl chloride, and hexachlorobenzene. Hooker expanded into plastics manufacturing, developing epoxy vinyl ester resins, and in 1955 acquired a thermoset plastic phenolic resins business, called Durez Corp.

Sale to Occidental Petroleum
Occidental Petroleum Corporation purchased Hooker Chemical Company in 1968. Since then, owners have renamed the company several times.

Documentaries
In 2002, filmmaker David J. Ruck told the story of the Hooker Chemical Company and its environmental negligence in Montague, Michigan, in the documentary film, This is Not a Chocolate Factory

The films, The Killing Ground and A Fierce Green Fire, also explore the history of several of Hooker Chemical's dumping sites and the Love Canal tragedy.

References

Chemical companies of the United States
Defunct manufacturing companies based in New York (state)
American companies established in 1903
1968 disestablishments in New York (state)
Manufacturing companies disestablished in 1968
Love Canal
Chemical companies established in 1903
1903 establishments in New York (state)
1968 mergers and acquisitions

External Links
 A Fierce Green Fire: The Battle for a Living Planet - Documentary film directed and written by Mark Kitchell. Explores 50 years of environmental activism in the USA. Inspired by the book of the same name by Philip Shabecoff.